The genus Ophioderma are distinctive ferns (or fern-allies) in the family Ophioglossaceae. Ophioderma is closely related to, and sometimes treated as a subgenus of, the genus Ophioglossum. It includes the genus formerly known as Cheiroglossa. Recent genetic analysis has indicated that the two genera should be treated as one, and Ophioderma has precedence by being validly published at an earlier date. The type species is Ophioderma pendulum.

Species
, World Ferns listed the following species:
Ophioderma falcatum (C.Presl) O.Deg.
Ophioderma intermedium (Hook.) Nishida
Ophioderma pendulum (L.) C.Presl
Ophioderma redactophyllum Chantanaorr. & Li Bing Zhang
Ophioderma simplex (Ridl. ex Bower) Nishida
Ophioderma subsessile Amoroso & Coritico

Notes

References

Hauk, Warren D., Clifford R. Parks and Mark W. Chasel. "Phylogenetic studies of Ophioglossaceae: evidence from rbcL and trnL-F plastid DNA sequences and morphology." Molecular Phylogenetics and Evolution, 28(1): 131-141. 2003.

Ophioglossaceae
Fern genera